Fosshageniidae is a family of crustaceans belonging to the order Calanoida.

Genera:
 Fosshagenia Suárez-Morales & Iliffe, 1996
 Temoropia Scott, 1894

References

Calanoida